Alexander Andreevich Ushakov (born 18 July 1948) is a former Soviet biathlete. In his career, he won three gold medals, one silver and one bronze medal at the Biathlon World Championships.

Biathlon results
All results are sourced from the International Biathlon Union.

World Championships
5 medals (3 gold, 1 silver, 1 bronze)

*During Olympic seasons competitions are only held for those events not included in the Olympic program.
**Sprint was added as an event in 1974.

References

1948 births
Living people
Soviet male biathletes
Biathlon World Championships medalists